Marcel Schillerr (born 15 August 1991) is a German handballer who plays for Frisch Auf Göppingen and the German national team.

International honours 
EHF Cup:
Winner: 2016, 2017

References

1991 births
Living people
People from Bad Urach
Sportspeople from Tübingen (region)
German male handball players
Frisch Auf Göppingen players
Handball-Bundesliga players
Handball players at the 2020 Summer Olympics